The Reformed Outlaw is a 1913 American short silent Western film directed by Romaine Fielding and starring Mary Ryan, Robyn Adair and Jesse Robinson. The Lubin Manufacturing Company produced the film and General Film Company distributed. The film is not to be confused with the 1912 film of the same name produced by Thomas Ince.

Cast
 Mary Ryan
 Robyn Adair
 Jesse Robinson
 Maurice Cytron
 Minnie Frayne
 Paul Keele
 Buck Buckner
 Henry Aldrich

References

External links
 

1913 films
1913 Western (genre) films
American silent short films
American black-and-white films
Films directed by Romaine Fielding
Lubin Manufacturing Company films
Silent American Western (genre) films
1910s American films